Lists of aquarium life include lists of fish, amphibians, invertebrates and plants in freshwater, brackish and marine aquariums.
In fishkeeping, suitable species of aquarium fish, plants and other organisms vary with the size, water chemistry and temperature of the aquarium.
The lists include:

 List of brackish aquarium fish species
 List of freshwater aquarium amphibian species
 List of freshwater aquarium fish species
 List of freshwater aquarium invertebrate species
 List of freshwater aquarium plant species
 List of marine aquarium fish species
 List of marine aquarium invertebrate species